Bromodomain-containing protein 3 (BRD3) also known as RING3-like protein (RING3L) is a protein that in humans is encoded by the BRD3 gene. This gene was identified based on its homology to the gene encoding the RING3 (BRD2) protein, a serine/threonine kinase. The gene maps to 9q34, a region which contains several major histocompatibility complex (MHC) genes.

Structure 

BRD3 is a member of the Bromodomain and Extra-Terminal motif (BET) protein family. Like other BET family members it contains two tandem homologous bromodomains and an "Extra-Terminal" motif.

BRD3, similar to BRD2, does not have a long C-terminal domain as BET family proteins BRD4 and BRDT do.

Function 

Like other BET protein family members, BRD3 associates with acetylated lysine residues on histones and transcription factors.

BRD3 has been implicated in nucleosome remodeling in the context of transcription. In addition, BRD3 has been shown to interact with RNA molecules and form protein-RNA aggregates. 

BRD2 and BRD3 perform overlapping cellular functions.

Clinical significance 

Chromosomal translocation of BRD3 with the NUT gene has been implicated in NUT midline carcinoma. BRD3-NUT driven cancers are histopathologically indistinguishable from BRD4-NUT driven cancers, likely because these translocations involve the N-terminal portion bromodomain-containing portion of these proteins which are highly conserved.

Depletion of BRD3 slows growth in cancer models including prostate cancer and medulloblastoma. The effect of BRD3 depletion is milder than that of other BET proteins BRD2 and BRD4 when each is tested in isolation. BET inhibitors target highly conserved BET bromodomains and displace BRD2, BRD3, and BRD4 from chromatin simultaneously. Functional redundancy between BRD2 and BRD3 suggests that their simultaneous disruption of these proteins may be more important than is appreciated by depletion of these proteins individually.

References

External links

Further reading